The 24th Golden Melody Awards ceremony for popular music category was held on July 6, 2013. The SET network broadcast the show live from the Taipei Arena in Taipei, Taiwan. The ceremony recognized the best recordings, compositions, and artists of the eligibility year, which runs from January 1, 2012 to December 31, 2012.

Nominees and winners

Winners are highlighted in boldface.

Vocal category – Record label awards

Song of the Year 
 "The Great Artist" (from Muse) – Jolin Tsai
 "Retrospection" (from Eternity, Promise) – Kay Huang
 "Wordless Song" (from Gaia) – Sandy Lam
 "Coastline" (from Coastline) – Yonlon Chen
 "Rose-colored" (from Games We Play) – Deserts Chang

Best Mandarin Album 
 Gaia – Sandy Lam Opus 12 – Jay Chou
 Ghetto Superstar – MC HotDog
 Back to Wonderland – Khalil Fong
 Muse – Jolin Tsai

 Best Taiwanese Album 
 Tainan – Hsieh Ming-yu The Ninth Album – New Formosa Band
 1st Album – Gigi Wu
 Love – Sasha Lee
 What's Happening? – Kou Chou Ching

 Best Hakka Album 
 The Way Home – Dark White Collar Walking – Huang Zhen-xin
 Antipodes – Tito Tang
 Jazz, Tang Dynasty – Hsieh Yu-wei
 Hold Your Hands – Grace Huang

 Best Aboriginal Album 
 A Cappella – O-kai A Beautiful Prediction – Resres
 Dalan – Sangpuy
 Amis – Suming
 Sun and Moon – Ado Kaliting Pacidal
 Calisi – Dakanow

 Best Music Video 
 Muh Chen – "Cheers" (from Second Round (No Where Edition)) Bill Chia – "Increase Power" (from Moment)
 Bill Chia – "Wordless Song" (from Gaia)
 Muh Chen – "Super Girl" (from Super Girl)
 Ken Huang, Eric Chen – "O La La Hu Hu" (from Guitar)
 Muh Chen – "The Great Artist" (from Muse)

 Vocal category – Individual awards 

 Best Composition 
 Kay Huang – "Retrospection" (from Eternity, Promise) JerryC – "Captain S.V" (from Fiction)
 Ellen Loo – "You're Nothing to Me" (from You Hide Silently)
 Lee Tsz-hang – "Coastline" (from Coastline)

 Best Lyrics 
 Deserts Chang – "Rose-colored" (from Games We Play) Ayugo Huang, Bobby Chen – "Is Diesel Oil" (from The Ninth Album)
 Michael Li – "Alzheimer" (from Love, After All)
 MC HotDog – "Ghetto Superstar" (from Ghetto Superstar)
 Lee Tsz-hang – "Coastline" (from Coastline)
 Deserts Chang – "Rose-colored" (from Games We Play)

 Best Music Arrangement 
 Chang Shilei – "Gaia" (from Gaia) Baby Chung – "Milihuwan" (from Dalan)
 Skot Suyama – "Runaway Mama" (from Fiction)
 Jason Huang – "A Larger Cello" (from Opus 12)
 Michele Weir – "Sakalima" (from A Cappella)

 Producer of the Year, Album 
 Sandy Lam, Chang Shilei – Gaia
 Chen Zhu-hui – Dalan
 Jay Chou – Opus 12
 Baby Chung – Eternity, Promise
 Lai Jia-ching, Tim Wang – A Cappella

Producer of the Year, Single 
 Luantan Ascent – "Different Friends" (from Unforgettable)
 Gideon Su – "I Can Believe" (from Miss Non-Rock)
 Peng Hsueh-bin – "Love in Heart" (from Love in Heart)
 Chris Hou, Winnie Hsin – "Soundless Love Song" (from Meet Happiness)

Best Mandarin Male Singer 
 Jam Hsiao
 Yoga Lin
 Jay Chou
 Xiao Yu
 Khalil Fong

Best Taiwanese Male Singer 
 Hsieh Ming-yu
 Weng Li-you
 Hsu Fu-kai
 Shao Ta-lun
 Wang Jun-jieh

Best Mandarin Female Singer 
 Sandy Lam
 Ellen Loo
 G.E.M.
 Jia Jia
 Lala Hsu
 Jolin Tsai

Best Taiwanese Female Singer 
 Sasha Lee
 Hanya Chang
 Showlen Maya
 Laney Wu
 Gigi Wu
 Jennie Hsieh

Best Hakka Singer 
 Tito Tang
 Huang Zhen-xin
 Hsieh Yu-wei
 Liu Jung-chang
 Grace Huang

Best Aboriginal Singer 
 Sangpuy
 Resres
 Suming
 Ado Kaliting Pacidal
 Dakanow

Best Band 
 Monkey Pilot
 Lie Gramophone
 Io
 Matzka
 My Skin Against Your Skin

Best Group 
 O-kai
 Kat n Candi x 2
 JS
 Tom & Huck

Best New Artist 
 Miss Ko
 Amuyi Lu
 Sangpuy
 Ann Bai
 Jia Jia
 Eve Ai
 O-kai

Instrumental category – Record label awards

Best Instrumental Album 
 Joyful Reunion Original Soundtrack – Baby Chung Flying Alone – Su Yuhan
 3 – Timeless Fusion Party
 Love Without Boundaries – Children's Garden
 On a Gentle Island Breeze – Daniel Ho

 Instrumental category – Individual awards 

 Producer of the Year, Album 
 Daniel Ho – On a Gentle Island Breeze
 Lu Sheng-fei, Tung, Shuen-wen – 3
 Sino Chen, Tao Wang – Love Without Boundaries
 Tung Yun-chang – With You There's Always Sunshine
 Baby Chung – Joyful Reunion: Original Motion Picture Soundtrack

Best Instrumental Composition 
 Sino Chen – "Waltz in Summer Palace" (from Love Without Boundaries)
 Su Yuhan – "Flying Alone" (from Flying Alone)
 Lu Sheng-fei – "Love Lemonade" (from 3)
 Baby Chung – "The Secret of the Master" (from Joyful Reunion: Original Motion Picture Soundtrack)
 Daniel Ho – "On a Gentle Island Breeze" (from On a Gentle Island Breeze)

Technical category – Individual awards

Best Album Design 
 Xiao Qing-yang – Die Glocke der Kartenkirche
 Aaron Nieh – Hollywood Zoo
 Tsai Jia-lun, Liao Jun-yu – Sea Food
 Joe Fang – The Way Home
 Xiao Qing-yang, Wang Wei-cheng, Huang Yao-ting, Lee Tsong-han – What's Happening?

Jury Award 
 O-kai

Lifetime Contribution Award 
 Fong Fei-fei

References

External links
  Official YouTube Channel

Golden Melody Awards
Golden Melody Awards
Golden Melody Awards
Golden Melody Awards